is a Japanese voice actor. He is affiliated with VIMS talent agency.

Filmography

TV anime

Anime films

Video games

Live-action Drama

Dubbing

Live Action
Space Jam: A New Legacy (2021), WB Executive (Steven Yeun)
Those Who Wish Me Dead (2021), Patrick (Nicholas Hoult)

Animation
Rock Dog (2016), Bodi (Luke Wilson) (2018 Netflix Dub)

References

External links
 

1998 births
Living people
Japanese male video game actors
Japanese male voice actors
Male voice actors from Aichi Prefecture
21st-century Japanese male actors